The Hitler family comprises the relatives and ancestors of Adolf Hitler (20 April 1889 – 30 April 1945), an Austrian-born German politician and the leader of the Nazi Party. He was the dictator of Germany, holding the title Chancellor of Germany from 1933 to 1945, and was also head of state as Führer und Reichskanzler from 1934 to 1945. He is noted for his central role in the rise of Nazism in Germany, provoking the start of World War II, and holding ultimate responsibility for the deaths of many millions of people during the Holocaust.

The family has long been of interest to historians and genealogists because of the biological uncertainty of Hitler's paternal grandfather, as well as the family's inter-relationships and their psychological effect on Hitler during his childhood and later life.

Etymology
Before Adolf Hitler's birth, his family used many variations of the family surname "Hitler" almost interchangeably. Some of the common variants were Hitler, Hiedler, Hüttler, Hytler, and Hittler. The name may be a spelling variation of the name Hiedler, meaning one who resides by a Hiedl, a term for a subterranean fountain or river in Austro-Bavarian German dialects. Or the Hitler surname may be based on "one who lives in a hut" (German Hütte for "hut"). Alois Schicklgruber (Adolf's father) changed his surname on 7 January 1877 to "Hitler", which was the only form of the last name that his son Adolf used.

Family history
The family is of Austrian German ethnicity.

Earliest family members
The first known beginning of the Hitler family is with Stefan Hiedler (born 1672) and Agnes Capeller, whose grandson Martin Hiedler (17 November 1762 – 10 January 1829) married Anna Maria Göschl (23 August 1760 – 7 December 1854). This couple had at least three children: Lorenz (1800–1861), Johann Georg (baptised 28 February 1792 – 9 February 1857), and Johann Nepomuk (19 March 1807 – 17 September 1888). Johann Georg was the stepfather of Alois Schicklgruber (later Hitler), who was Adolf Hitler's father, and Johann Nepomuk was the future Führer's maternal great-grandfather. There is no additional information about Lorenz Hiedler. The Hiedlers were from Spital, part of Weitra in Austria.

Johann Georg and Johann Nepomuk
Brothers Johann Georg and Johann Nepomuk Hiedler are associated with Adolf Hitler in several ways, although the biological relationship is disputed.

Johann Georg was legitimized and considered the officially accepted paternal grandfather of Hitler by Nazi Germany. Whether he was actually Hitler's biological paternal grandfather remains unknown. He married his first wife in 1824, but she died in childbirth five months later. In 1842, he married Maria Anna Schicklgruber (15 April 1795 – 7 January 1847) and became the legal stepfather to her illegitimate five-year-old son, Alois.

Around age 10, near the time of his mother's death, Alois went to live with Johann Nepomuk on his farm. Johann Nepomuk Hiedler (also known as Johann Nepomuk Hüttler) was named after a Bohemian saint, Johann von Nepomuk, an important saint for Bohemians of both German and Czech ethnicity. Johann Nepomuk became a relatively prosperous farmer and was married to Eva Maria Decker (1792–1873), who was fifteen years his senior.

The Nazis issued a pamphlet during the 1932 second elections campaign titled "Facts and Lies about Hitler" which refuted the rumour spread by the S.P.D. and Centre Party that Hitler had Czech ancestors. There is no evidence that any of Hitler's ancestors were of Czech origin.

Father of Alois Hitler

The identity of the biological father of Alois is disputed. Legally, Johann Georg Hiedler, an itinerant miller, was the step-father of Alois Schicklgruber (later Alois Hitler), and Johann Georg's brother Johann Nepomuk Hiedler was therefore the step-uncle of Alois. Johann Nepomuk adopted Alois informally during Alois' childhood and raised him. It is possible that he was, in fact, the natural father of Alois but could not acknowledge this publicly due to his marriage. A perhaps simpler explanation is that he pitied the ten-year-old Alois after the death of the boy's mother Maria, as it could hardly have been a suitable life for a ten-year-old child to be raised by an itinerant miller. Johann Nepomuk died on 17 September 1888 and willed Alois a considerable portion of his life savings.

It was later claimed that Johann Georg had fathered Alois prior to his marriage to Maria, although Alois had been declared illegitimate on his birth certificate and baptism papers. The claim that Johann Georg was the true father of Alois was not made during the lifetime of either Johann Georg or Maria. In 1877, 20 years after the death of Johann Georg and almost 30 years after the death of Maria, Alois was legally declared to have been Johann Georg's son. Johann Nepomuk arranged to change the surname of Alois to "Hitler" and to have Johann Georg declared the biological father of Alois in 1876. Johann Nepomuk collected three witnesses (his son-in-law and two others) who testified before a notary in Weitra that Johann Georg had several times stated in their presence that he was the actual father of Alois and wanted to make Alois his legitimate son and heir. The parish priest in Döllersheim, where the original birth certificate of Alois resided, altered the birth register. Alois was 39 years old at the time and was well-known in the community as Alois Schicklgruber.

Accordingly, Johann Georg Hiedler is often cited as having possibly been the biological grandfather of Adolf Hitler. Although Alois was legitimized and Johann Georg Hiedler was considered the officially accepted paternal grandfather of Hitler by the Third Reich, whether he was Hitler's biological grandfather remains unknown, which has caused speculation. However, his case is considered the most plausible and widely accepted. Speculations have been made, particularly regarding Johann Nepomuk and a Graz Jew by the name of Leopold Frankenberger, rumored by the head of the General Government in Nazi-occupied Poland, Hans Frank during the Nuremberg Trials. Historians have concluded that Frank's speculation has no factual support. Frank said that Maria came from "Leonding near Linz", when in fact she came from the hamlet of Strones, near the village of Döllersheim. No evidence has been found that a "Frankenberger" lived in the area; the Jews were expelled from Styria (which includes Graz) during the 15th century and were not permitted to return until the 1860s, several decades after the birth of Alois.

Pölzl family
Johanna Hiedler, the daughter of Johann Nepomuk and Eva Hiedler (née Decker) was born on 19 January 1830 in Spital (part of Weitra) in the Waldviertel of Lower Austria. She lived her entire life there and was married to Johann Baptist Pölzl (1825–1901), a farmer and son of Johann Pölzl and Juliana (Walli) Pölzl. Johanna and Johann had 5 sons and 6 daughters, of whom 2 sons and 3 daughters survived into adulthood, the daughters being Klara, Johanna, and Theresia. Klara's brothers' identities are unknown.

1870s

At the age of 36, Alois Hitler was married for the first time, to Anna Glasl-Hörer, who was a wealthy, 50-year-old daughter of a customs official. She was sick when Alois married her and was either an invalid or became one soon afterwards. Not long after the wedding, Alois Hitler began an affair with 19-year-old Franziska "Fanni" Matzelsberger, one of the young female servants employed at the Pommer Inn, house no. 219, in the city of Braunau am Inn, where he was renting the top floor as a lodging. Bradley Smith states that Alois had numerous affairs during the 1870s, resulting in his wife initiating legal action. On 7 November 1880 Alois and Anna separated by mutual agreement. Franziska Matzelsberger became the 43-year-old Hitler's girlfriend, but the two could not marry since by Roman Catholic canon law divorce is not permitted.

1880s

On 13 January 1882, Franziska Matzelsberger gave birth to Alois Hitler's illegitimate son, also named Alois. As his parents were not married, the boy was named Alois Matzelsberger. Alois Hitler remained with Franziska while his wife, Anna, grew sicker and died on 6 April 1883. The next month, on 22 May, in a ceremony in Braunau with fellow customs officials as witnesses, Alois Hitler, 45, married Franziska Matzelsberger, 21. Alois then legitimized his son with Franziska, renaming him Alois Hitler Jr., who later became a Berlin restaurateur. Matzelsberger went to Vienna to give birth to Angela Hitler. When Franziska was only 23 years old, she acquired a lung disorder and became too ill to function. She was relocated to Ranshofen, a small village near Braunau.

In 1876, three years after Alois' marriage to Anna Glasl-Hörer, he had hired Klara Pölzl as a household servant. Klara was the 16-year-old granddaughter of Alois' step-uncle (and possible biological uncle or father), Johann Nepomuk Hiedler. After Franziska demanded that the "servant girl" find another job, Alois sent Klara away. However, Klara returned to Alois and Franziska's home during the last months of Franziska's life, to care for her and her two children, as she was an invalid. Franziska Matzelsberger died in Ranshofen on 10 August 1884 at the age of 23. After Franziska's death, Klara Pölzl stayed on as housekeeper.

Klara Pölzl soon became pregnant. Her family relationship with Alois was ambiguous. If Johann Georg Hiedler were Alois Hitler's biological father, Klara would be Alois' first cousin once removed; if Johann Nepomuk were Alois Hitler's biological father, Klara would be Alois' half-niece. Bradley Smith writes that if he had been free to do as he wished, Alois would have married Klara immediately, but because of the affidavit regarding his paternity, Alois was now legally Klara's first cousin once removed, and so too close to marry. Alois submitted an appeal to the church for a humanitarian waiver. Permission was granted, and on 7 January 1885 the wedding took place in Hitler's rented rooms on the top floor of the Pommer Inn. A meal was served to the few guests and witnesses. Alois then went to work for the rest of the day. Even Klara found the wedding to be a brief ceremony. Throughout the marriage, she continued to call him uncle.

On 17 May 1885, five months after the wedding, the new Frau Klara Hitler gave birth to Gustav, her first child with Alois Hitler. One year later, on 25 September 1886, she gave birth to a daughter, Ida. The third child, Otto, was born not long after Ida, in 1887, but died days later. In the winter of 1887–88, both Gustav and Ida died of diphtheria, 8 December and 2 January, respectively. By then, Klara and Alois had been married for three years, and all their children were dead, but his children with Franziska Matzelsberger — Alois Jr. and Angela — survived. On 20 April 1889, Klara gave birth to Adolf Hitler.

1890s

Adolf was a sickly child, and his mother fretted over him. Alois, who was 51 years old when Adolf was born, had little interest in child rearing and left it to his wife. When not at work he was typically either in a tavern or busy with his hobby, beekeeping.

In 1892, Alois was transferred from Braunau to Passau. He was 55, Klara 32, Alois Jr. 10, Angela 9, and Adolf 3 years old. In 1894, Alois Hitler was reassigned to Linz. Klara gave birth to their fifth child, Edmund, on 24 March 1894, and it was decided that she and the children would stay in Passau for the time being.

The farm was called the Rauscher Gut. He relocated his family to the farm and retired on 25 June 1895 at the age of 58 after 40 years in the customs service. He found farming difficult; he lost money, and the value of the property decreased. On 21 January 1896, his daughter Paula was born. Alois was often home with his family. He had five children ranging in age from infancy to 14; Bradley Smith suggests he yelled at the children frequently and made long visits to the local tavern. Robert G. L. Waite noted, "Even one of his closest friends admitted that Alois was 'awfully rough' with his wife Klara and hardly ever spoke a word to her at home. If Hitler was in a bad mood, he picked on the older children or Klara herself, in front of the rest."

After Alois and Alois Jr had a violent argument, Alois Jr left home at 14, and the elder Alois swore he would never give the boy any inheritance more than what the law required. Apparently Alois Jr's relations with his stepmother Klara were also difficult. After working as an apprentice waiter in the Shelbourne Hotel in Dublin, Ireland, Alois Jr was arrested for theft and served a five-month sentence in 1900, followed by a nine-month sentence in 1902.

1900s
Edmund, the youngest Hitler boy, died of measles on 2 February 1900. Alois wanted his son Adolf to seek a career with the civil service. According to various interpretations, Adolf disliked the thought of a career spent enforcing petty rules, and was perhaps so alienated from his father that he was repulsed by whatever Alois wanted. Alois tried to intimidate his son into obedience, but Adolf refused.

Alois Hitler died in 1903, leaving Klara a government pension. She sold the house in Leonding and relocated with young Adolf and Paula to an apartment in Linz, where they lived frugally. By 1907, Klara had become very ill due to breast cancer. Despite continued medical treatment by her doctor, Eduard Bloch, Klara's condition did not improve, and in October Bloch told Adolf her condition was hopeless. Adolf wept when told that his mother "had little chance of surviving". Klara died at home in Linz on 21 December 1907. Adolf and Paula were left with some financial assistance from their mother's pension and her modest estate of about 2,000 Kronen, after the medical and funeral costs were paid. Klara was buried in Leonding. Hitler had a good relationship with his mother during her lifetime. He was distraught by her death and possibly grieved for the rest of his life. Speaking of Hitler, Bloch later recalled that after Klara's death he had never seen "anyone so prostrate with grief". Hitler wrote years later that his mother's death was a "dreadful blow".

On 14 September 1903 Angela Hitler, Adolf's half-sister, married Leo Raubal (11 June 1879 – 10 August 1910), a junior tax inspector, and on 12 October 1906 she gave birth to a son, Leo. On 4 June 1908 Angela gave birth to a daughter Geli and in 1910 to a second daughter, Elfriede (Elfriede Maria Hochegger, 10 January 1910 – 24 September 1993).

1910s
In 1909, Alois Hitler Jr. met an Irish woman by the name of Bridget Dowling at the Dublin Horse Show. They eloped to London and married on 3 June 1910. William Dowling, Bridget's father, threatened to have Alois arrested for kidnapping, but Bridget dissuaded him. The couple settled in Liverpool, where their son William Patrick Hitler was born in 1911. The family lived in a flat at 102 Upper Stanhope Street. The house was destroyed in the last German air-raid on Liverpool on 10 January 1942. Nothing remains of the house or those that surrounded it, and the area was eventually cleared and grassed over. In her memoirs,  Bridget Dowling claims that Adolf Hitler lived with them in Liverpool from 1912 to 1913 while he was on the run to avoid being conscripted in his native Austria-Hungary, but historians dismiss this story as a fiction invented to make the book more appealing to publishers. Alois attempted to make money by managing a small restaurant in Dale Street, a boarding house on Parliament Street and a hotel on Mount Pleasant, all of which failed. Alois Jr. left his family in May 1914 and he returned alone to the German Empire to establish himself in the safety razor business.

Paula had relocated to Vienna, where she worked as a secretary. She did not communicate with Adolf Hitler during the period comprising his difficult years as a painter in Vienna and later Munich, military service during the First World War and early political activities back in Munich. She was delighted to meet him again in Vienna during the early 1920s, though she later claimed to have been privately distraught at his subsequent increasing fame.

First World War

When the First World War began, Alois Jr. was in Germany and it was impossible for his wife and son to join him. He married another woman, Hedwig Heidemann, in 1916. After the war, a third party mistakenly informed Bridget that he was dead.

At the beginning of the First World War, Adolf Hitler was a resident of Munich and volunteered to serve in the Bavarian Army as an Austrian citizen. He was posted to the Bavarian Reserve Infantry Regiment 16 (1st Company of the List Regiment). Hitler's case was not exceptional as he was not the only Austrian soldier in the List Regiment. Hitler may have been accepted into the Bavarian army because nobody had asked him whether he was a German citizen when he volunteered, or because the recruiting authorities were happy to accept any volunteer and did not care what Hitler's nationality was, or because he might have told the Bavarian authorities that he intended to become a German citizen.

He served as a dispatch runner on the Western Front in France and Belgium, spending nearly half his time well behind the front lines. He was present at the First Battle of Ypres, the Battle of the Somme, the Battle of Arras and the Battle of Passchendaele, and was wounded at the Somme.

He was decorated for bravery, receiving the Iron Cross, Second Class, in 1914. Recommended by Hugo Gutmann, he received the Iron Cross, First Class, on 4 August 1918, a decoration rarely awarded to one of Hitler's rank. Hitler's post at regimental headquarters, providing frequent interactions with senior officers, may have helped him receive this decoration. Though his rewarded actions may have been courageous, they were probably not very exceptional. He also received the Black Wound Badge on 18 May 1918.

During his service at the headquarters, Hitler pursued his artwork, drawing cartoons, and instructions for an army newspaper. During the Battle of the Somme in October 1916, he was wounded either in the groin area or the left thigh by a shell that had exploded in the dispatch runners' dugout.

Hitler spent almost two months in the Red Cross hospital at Beelitz, returning to his regiment on 5 March 1917. On 15 October 1918, he was temporarily blinded by a mustard gas attack and was hospitalised in Pasewalk. While there, Hitler learnt of Germany's defeat, and—by his own account—on receiving this news, he suffered a second bout of blindness.

Hitler became embittered about Germany's defeat, and his ideological development began. He described the war as "the greatest of all experiences", and was praised by his commanding officers for his bravery. The experience reinforced his German nationalist beliefs and he was shocked by Germany's capitulation in November 1918. Like other German nationalists, he believed in the Dolchstoßlegende (stab-in-the-back legend), which claimed that the German army, "undefeated in the field", had been "stabbed in the back" on the home front by civilian politicians and Marxists, later dubbed the "November criminals".

The Treaty of Versailles stipulated that Germany was to relinquish several of its territories and demilitarise the Rhineland. The treaty imposed economic sanctions and levied large reparations on the country. Many Germans perceived the treaty—especially Article 231, which declared Germany responsible for the war—as a humiliation. The Versailles Treaty and the conditions in Germany after the war were later exploited by Hitler for political gains.

1920s
On 14 March 1920, Heinrich "Heinz" Hitler was born to Alois Jr. and his second wife, Hedwig Heidemann. In 1924, Alois Jr. was prosecuted for bigamy, but acquitted due to Bridget's intervention on his behalf. His older son, William Patrick, stayed with Alois and his new family during his early trips to Weimar Republic Germany in the late 1920s and early 1930s.

When Adolf was confined in Landsberg, Angela travelled from Vienna to visit him. Angela's daughters, Geli and Elfriede, accompanied their mother when she became Hitler's housekeeper in 1925; Geli Raubal was 17 at the time and would spend the next six years in close contact with her half-uncle. Her mother was given a job as housekeeper at the Berghof villa near Berchtesgaden in 1928. Geli relocated into Hitler's Munich apartment in 1929 when she enrolled in the Ludwig Maximilian University to study medicine. She did not complete her medical studies.

Hitler behaved in a domineering and possessive manner with Geli. When he discovered she was having a relationship with his chauffeur, Emil Maurice, he forced an end to the affair and dismissed Maurice from his personal service. After that he did not allow her to associate freely with friends, and attempted to have himself or someone he trusted near her at all times, accompanying her while she shopped or attended movies or  opera.

Adolf met Eva Braun, 23 years his junior, at Heinrich Hoffmann's photography studio in Munich in October 1929. He occasionally dated other women as well, including Hoffmann's daughter, Henrietta, and Maria Reiter.

1930s
Hitler's half-niece Geli Raubal committed suicide in 1931. Rumours immediately began in the media about a possible sexual relationship, and even murder. Historian Ian Kershaw contends that stories which circulated at the time alleging "sexual deviant practices ought to be viewed as anti-Hitler propaganda".

After having little communication with her brother Adolf, Paula was delighted to meet him again in Vienna during the early 1930s.

When the NSDAP won 107 seats in the Reich parliament in 1930, the Times Union in Albany, New York, published a statement of Alois, Jr.

Second World War
As Hitler prepared for war, he became distant from his family. Angela and Adolf became estranged after she disapproved of Adolf's relationship with Eva Braun, but eventually re-established communication during the war. Angela was his intermediary to the rest of the family, because Adolf did not want communication with them. In 1941, she sold her memoirs of her years with Hitler to the Eher Verlag, which brought her 20,000 Reichsmark. Meanwhile, Alois Jr. continued to manage his restaurant throughout the duration of the war. He was arrested later by the British, but released when it became evident he had no role in his brother's regime.

Hitler's second cousin, once removed, Aloisa Veit (named as Alois V), was gassed as part of the Nazi programme Aktion T4 which was a campaign to kill people who were deemed to be mentally ill. It is not known if Hitler knew of her fate.

A couple of Adolf's relatives served in Nazi Germany during the war. Adolf's nephew Heinz was a member of the Nazi Party. He attended an elite military academy, the National Political Institutes of Education (Napola) in Ballenstedt, Anhalt. Aspiring to be an officer, Heinz joined the army as a signals NCO with the 23rd Potsdamer Artillery Regiment in 1941, and he participated with the invasion of the Soviet Union, Operation Barbarossa. On 10 January 1942, he was captured by Soviet forces and sent to the Moscow military prison Butyrka, where he died, aged 21, after interrogation and torture. He never married nor had children.

Adolf's other nephew, Leo Rudolf Raubal, was conscripted into the Luftwaffe. He was wounded in January 1943 during the Battle of Stalingrad, and Friedrich Paulus asked Hitler for an airplane to evacuate Raubal to Germany. Hitler refused and Raubal was captured by the Soviets on 31 January 1943. Hitler gave orders to check the possibility of a prisoner exchange with the Soviets for Stalin's son Yakov Dzhugashvili, who was in German captivity since 16 July 1941. Stalin refused to exchange him either for Raubal or for Friedrich Paulus, and said "war is war".

During the spring of 1945, after the destruction of Dresden in the massive bomb attack of 13/14 February, Adolf relocated Angela to Berchtesgaden to avoid her being captured by the Soviets. Also, he let her and his younger sister Paula have more than 100,000 Reichsmark. Paula barely saw her brother during the war. There is some evidence Paula shared her brother's strong German nationalist beliefs, but she was not politically active and never joined the Nazi Party. During the ending days of the war, at the age of 49, she was driven to Berchtesgaden, Germany, apparently on the orders of Martin Bormann.

After midnight on the night of 28–29 April 1945, Adolf and Eva Braun were married in a small civil ceremony within the Führerbunker in Berlin. At the same location, on the following day of 30 April, the couple committed suicide.

Post-Second World War
In Hitler's last will and testament, he guaranteed Angela a pension of 1,000 Reichsmark monthly. It is uncertain if she ever received any of this amount. Nevertheless, she spoke very well of him even after the war, and claimed that neither her brother nor she herself had known anything about the Holocaust. She declared that if Hitler had known what was going on in the concentration camps, he would have stopped them.

Adolf's sister Paula was arrested by US intelligence officers in May 1945 and debriefed later that year. A transcript shows one of the agents remarking she bore a physical resemblance to her sibling. She told them the Soviets had confiscated her house in Austria, the Americans had expropriated her Vienna apartment and that she was taking English lessons. She characterized her childhood relationship with her brother as one of both frequent bickering and strong affection. Paula said she could not believe her brother had been responsible for the Holocaust. She also told them she had met Eva Braun only once. Paula was released from American custody and returned to Vienna, where she lived on her savings for a time, then worked in an arts and crafts shop.

Other relatives of Hitler were appropriated by the Soviets. In May 1945, five of Hitler's relatives were arrested, his first cousins, Maria, Johann and Eduard Schmidt, along with Maria's husband Ignaz Koppensteiner, their son Adolf, and Johann Schmidt Jr., son of Maria and Eduard's deceased brother Johann. Koppensteiner was arrested by the Soviets on the basis that he "approved of [Hitler's] criminal plans against the USSR". He died in a Moscow prison in 1949. Both Eduard and Maria died in Soviet custody in 1951 and 1953, respectively. Johann Jr. was released in 1955. These relatives were pardoned posthumously by Russia in 1997.

In 1952, Paula Hitler relocated to Berchtesgaden, reportedly living "in seclusion" in a two-room flat as Paula Wolff. ("Wolf" was Adolf Hitler's self-adopted nickname.) During this time, she was cared for by former members of the SS and survivors of her brother's inner circle. In February 1959, she agreed to be interviewed by Peter Morley, a documentary producer for British television station Associated-Rediffusion. The resulting conversation was the only filmed interview she ever gave and was broadcast as part of a programme named Tyranny: The Years of Adolf Hitler. She talked mostly about Hitler's childhood.

Angela died of a stroke on 30 October 1949. Her brother, Alois Jr., died on 20 May 1956 in Hamburg. At that time, his name was Alois Hiller. Paula, Adolf's last surviving sibling, died on 1 June 1960, at the age of 64.

Descendants of relatives
Angela married Leo Raubal Sr. (1879–1910). They had three children: Leo Rudolf Raubal Jr had one son, Peter Raubal, in 1931; Geli Raubal committed suicide without having ever had a child in 1931; and Elfriede Raubal married Ernst Hochegger in 1937 and had a son, Heiner Hochegger, in 1945 and a daughter.

Heinz Hitler, who was the son of Alois from his second marriage, died in a Soviet military prison in 1942 without children.

William Patrick Hitler, the son of Alois from his first marriage, married Phyllis Jean-Jacques in 1947 in the US, where they had four children. Also that year, he changed his surname to Stuart-Houston; some have commented on its similarity with the name of the racialist writer Houston Stewart Chamberlain. Their children, Alexander Adolf Stuart-Houston (1949), Louis Stuart-Houston (1951), Howard Ronald Stuart-Houston (1957), and Brian William Stuart-Houston (1965), have not had any children. Only Howard, who died in a car crash in 1989, was ever married.

According to David Gardner, author of the 2001 book The Last of the Hitlers, "They didn't sign a pact, but what they did is, they talked amongst themselves, talked about the burden they've had in the background of their lives, and decided that none of them would marry, none of them would have children. And that's a pact they've kept to this day." Though none of Stuart-Houston's sons had children, his son Alexander, a social worker as of 2002, said that contrary to this speculation, there was no intentional pact to end the Hitler bloodline.

Alleged sons
It is alleged that Hitler had a son, Jean-Marie Loret, with a Frenchwoman named Charlotte Lobjoie. Jean-Marie Loret was born in March 1918 and died in 1985, aged 67. Loret married several times, and had as many as nine children. His family's lawyer has suggested that, if their descent from Hitler could be proven, they may be able to claim royalties for Hitler's book, Mein Kampf. However, several historians, such as Anton Joachimsthaler, and Sir Ian Kershaw, say that Hitler's paternity is unlikely or impossible to prove. Nevertheless, it was noted that the two shared a strong physical resemblance.

Hitler has also been alleged to have had another son with Unity Mitford, a British socialite who had been within Hitler's inner circle. Following Mitford's attempted suicide and return to the United Kingdom, she spent time at Hill View Cottage, a private maternity home in Oxfordshire. The theory alleged that Hitler and Mitford had a much closer relationship than previously known, and that Mitford was in fact pregnant and had given birth to Hitler's son, who was subsequently given up for adoption, and whose identity was protected. Journalist Martin Bright, who had been contacted regarding this theory after publishing a previous article on Mitford, investigated the maternity home. Bright found that Hill View Cottage was used as a maternity home during the war and that the presence of Mitford was a consistent rumour throughout the village. A look through the birth records at the Oxfordshire register office was also consistent with what Bright's contact had claimed about the maternity home, including that it had been managed by their aunt Betty Norton, but there was no record of Mitford having been at the home. A lack of recordkeeping at the home was not uncommon, as had been claimed by the records officer. Bright contacted the sister of Unity Mitford, Deborah, who was the last of the Mitford sisters still alive at the time. Deborah dismissed the theory of Hitler's baby as "gossip of villagers", but confirmed that Unity had stayed at the maternity home to recover from a nervous breakdown. Inquiring with the National Archives, Bright also found a file on Unity sealed under the 100-year rule. He received special permission to open it and discovered that in October 1941, Unity Mitford had been consorting with a married RAF test pilot, which Bright stated "was hard evidence that Unity might not have been quite the invalid it was supposed". The theory of Mitford giving birth to Hitler's baby was popularised by the Channel 4 documentary Hitler's British Girl, which covered Bright's investigation. It had also been revealed that MI5 wished to interrogate her after her return to Britain, and it was only on the intervention of the Home Secretary Sir John Anderson that she was not. The Evening Standard wrote of this theory that "Unity would have been happy to bear Hitler's child, preferably in wedlock rather than out of it. She never disguised her wish to marry the Führer." Unlike Loret, the identity of this alleged son or whether he even exists remains unknown and is near impossible to prove, for this reason many historians and those who knew Mitford personally have dismissed the allegation.

List of family members
 Adolf Hitler (1889–1945)
 Eva Braun (1912–1945), wife
 Alois Hitler Sr. (1837–1903), father
 Klara Hitler (1860–1907), mother
 Alois Hitler Jr. (né Matzelsberger) (1882–1956), elder half-brother
 Angela Hitler (1883–1949), elder half-sister
 Four of Adolf's siblings died in infancy or early childhood of illnesses:
 Gustav Hitler (1885–1887), died of diphtheria
 Ida Hitler (1886–1888), died of diphtheria
 Otto Hitler (1887–1887)
 Edmund Hitler (1894–1900), died of measles
 Paula Hitler (1896–1960), younger sister and only full sibling to survive into adulthood
 Bridget Dowling (1891–1969), sister-in-law
 Geli Raubal (1908–1931), niece
 Gretl Braun (1915–1987), sister-in-law through Hitler's marriage to Eva Braun
 Heinz Hitler (1920–1942), nephew
 Ilse Braun (1909–1979), sister-in-law through Hitler's marriage to Eva Braun
 Johann Georg Hiedler (1792–1857), presumed paternal grandfather
 Johann Nepomuk Hiedler (1807–1888), maternal great-grandfather, presumed great uncle, and possibly Hitler's true paternal grandfather
 Leo Raubal Jr (1906–1977), nephew
 Maria Schicklgruber (1795–1847), paternal grandmother
 Johanna Hiedler (1830–1906), maternal grandmother
 William Patrick Hitler (1911–1987), nephew, born in Liverpool, England

Hitler family tree
Note: For simplicity, the first (childless) marriage of Alois Hitler (b. 1837) to Anna Glasl-Hörer has been excluded, as have any marriages that may have occurred after 1945.

Braun family tree
Note: For simplicity, the second marriages after 1945 of Ilse and Gretl have been excluded.

References
Informational notes

Citations

Bibliography

 
 
 

 
 
 
 
 
 
 
 

Further reading

External links

 

 
Austrian families
Roman Catholic families